The Lakes Region League is composed of eight New England preparatory schools that compete athletically and academically. Its members are also members of the New England Prep School Athletic Conference (NEPSAC). The league's name comes from the Lakes Region of New Hampshire, United States, where most of the schools are located. The eight members are Proctor Academy, New Hampton School, Kimball Union Academy, Tilton School, Holderness School, Vermont Academy, St. Paul's School and Brewster Academy. The league is most notably regarded for excelling in basketball, hockey and lacrosse.

References

High school sports conferences and leagues in the United States
High school sports in New Hampshire